Christian Smith may refer to:

Christian Smith (sociologist) (born 1960), American professor at the University of Notre Dame
Christian Smith (footballer) (born 1987), English footballer
Christian Smith (athlete), middle-distance runner for the Oregon Track Club Elite
Christian Smith (musician), bassoonist at Brigham Young University
Christian Smith (DJ), Swedish DJ and producer
Christian Jollie Smith (1885–1963), socialist lawyer and co-founder of the Communist Party of Australia
Christen Smith (1785–1816), Norwegian naturalist whose name is sometimes spelled Christian Smith or Chretien Smith

See also
Chris Smith (disambiguation)
Christopher Smith (disambiguation)
Christine Smith (disambiguation)
Christina Smith (disambiguation)